Baba'i ben Lotf (died after 1662) was a Jewish poet and historian in 17th-century Safavid Iran. He lived in Kashan, where he probably originally hailed from, and was the author of the first Judeo-Persian chronicle, the Ketāb-e anūsī. It is written in Persian using Hebrew script and consists of some 5,300 verses. Baba'i ben Farhad (fl. 18th century) was one of his grandsons.

Sources
 
 
 

17th-century deaths
Iranian Jews
17th-century writers of Safavid Iran
People from Kashan
17th-century Persian-language writers
Jewish poets
Safavid historians
Jewish historians
17th-century poets
17th-century Iranian historians